is a 1989 Japanese drama film by director Shōhei Imamura, based on the novel of the same name by Masuji Ibuse. The story centers on the aftermath of the atomic bombing of Hiroshima and its effect on a surviving family.

Plot
Half-orphan Yasuko, who lives with her uncle Shigematsu and his wife Shigeko in Hiroshima, is in the middle of moving family belongings to the house of an acquaintance in the vicinity, when the atomic bomb is dropped. She returns to the city by boat and gets into a black rain, a fallout resulting from the bombing. After Yasuko is re-united with her uncle and aunt, the trio heads for the factory where her uncle works to escape the spreading fires. Their route is marked by ruins, scattered corpses, and severely burnt survivors.

5 years later, Yasuko lives with her uncle, aunt and her uncle's mother in Fukuyama. As she has long reached the age when a woman should get married by tradition, Shigematsu and Shigeko try to find a husband for her. Yet all prospects' families withdraw their proposal when they hear of Yasuko's presence in Hiroshima on the day of the bombing, fearing that she might become ill or be unable to give birth to healthy children. Yasuko eventually accepts her situation and decides to stay with her uncle's family, even when her father, who re-married, offers her to live in his house.

Shigematsu witnesses his friends, all hibakusha suffering from radiation sickness, die one after another, while also his, his wife's and niece's health is slowly deteriorating. Yasuko starts feeling close to Yuichi, a young man from the neighbourhood who is suffering from a war trauma. When Yuichi's mother asks for Shigematsu's approval of her son marrying Yasuko, he is indignant at first because of Yuichi's mental illness, but later agrees. Shortly after, Yasuko, already suffering from a tumor, starts losing her hair and is sent to the hospital. Shigematsu watches the departing ambulance, hoping for a rainbow to appear which would indicate that she will recover.

Throughout the film, the story of the consequences of the bombing of Hiroshima are portrayed in graphic detail, with journals and firsthand accounts of the victims of the Hiroshima atomic bombing in order to shed light on how terrible nuclear weapons can be for innocent civilians.  One of these victims recollected that he “was three years old at the time of the bombing.  {He couldn’t} remember much, but {he did} recall that {his} surroundings turned blindingly white…Then, pitch darkness.  {He} was buried alive under the house.  {His} face was misshapen. {He} was certain that {he} was dead.”  This is reflected in a scene where bodies were engulfed by a blinding light followed by the insurmountable suffering of the masses.  There is another story of a woman’s father who was in the blast and suffered from many of the same long-term effects of the bomb. In both the account and in the movie, hair falls out of the victims’ heads and they slowly die of radiation poisoning from the bomb.

Some of the accounts described the horrors of the surroundings and the conditions of the bodies after the bombing.  Yoshiro Yamawaki and his brothers were going to check on their father who was working in a factory.  The air quality is described in both the witness’ story and the movie as being horrible, smelling of rotten flesh.  They passed many misshapen bodies and some who had their “”skin peeling off just like that of an over - ripe peach, exposing the white fat underneath.’” When the uncle of the main character exits the train station, there are black skinned bodies everywhere and countless others who are so disfigured that their own family could not even recognize them, which ultimately reveals in dramatic detail the lifelong negative effects of nuclear weapons on a population.

Cast
 Yoshiko Tanaka as Yasuko
 Kazuo Kitamura as Shigematsu Shizuma
 Etsuko Ichihara as Shigeko Shizuma
 Shōichi Ozawa as Shokichi
 Norihei Miki as Kotaro
 Keisuke Ishida as Yuichi
 Hisako Hara as Kin
 Masato Yamada as Tatsu
 Taiji Tonoyama as priest

Reception
Black Rain met with mostly positive reviews. Roger Ebert of the Chicago Sun-Times gave it 3½ of 4 stars, praising its "beautifully textured" black-and-white photography and pointing out that its purpose was not an anti-nuclear message movie but "a film about how the survivors of that terrible day internalized their experiences". Geoff Andrew, writing for Time Out, stated that "despite the largely sensitive depiction of waste, suffering and despair, the often ponderous pacing and the script's solemnity tend to work against emotional involvement". Film scholar Alexander Jacoby discovered an "almost Ozu-like quietism", citing Black Rain as an example of the "mellowed" Imamura in his later years. Film historian Donald Richie pointed out the film's "warmth, sincerity and compassion".

Awards
 Japanese Academy Awards 1990: Best Actress, Best Cinematography, Best Director, Best Editing, Best Film, Best Lighting, Best Music Score, Best Screenplay, Best Supporting Actress (Etsuko Ichihara)
 Blue Ribbon Award 1990: Best Actress
 Cannes Film Festival 1989: Prize of the Ecumenical Jury – Special Mention, Technical Grand Prize
 Flanders International Film Festival Ghent 1989: Georges Delerue Prize, Golden Spur
 Hochi Film Awards 1989: Best Actress
 Kinema Junpo Award 1990: Best Actress, Best Director, Best Film
 Mainichi Film Concours 1990: Best Actress, Best Art Direction, Best Film
 Sant Jordi Awards 1991: Best Foreign Film

References

Further reading

External links
 

1989 films
1989 crime drama films
1980s war drama films
Japanese war drama films
Japanese black-and-white films
Films based on Japanese novels
Films directed by Shohei Imamura
Films scored by Toru Takemitsu
Films about the atomic bombings of Hiroshima and Nagasaki
Films set in Hiroshima
Films shot in Hiroshima
Picture of the Year Japan Academy Prize winners
Films about post-traumatic stress disorder
Best Film Kinema Junpo Award winners
Japanese nonlinear narrative films
Japanese World War II films
1980s Japanese films